The Duchy of Lancaster Act 1808 (48 Geo 3 c 73) is an Act of the Parliament of the United Kingdom.

The Duchy of Lancaster Act 1808 was repealed, excepting so far as any powers, provisions, matters or things related to or affected the Duchy of Lancaster or any of the hereditaments, possessions or property within the ordering and survey of the Duchy of Lancaster, by section 1 of the Crown Lands Act 1829 (10 Geo 4 c 50).

Sections 1 and 2 and 4 and 5 and 7 and 20 were repealed by section 1(4) of, and the Schedule to, the Duchy of Lancaster Act 1988.

References
Halsbury's Statutes,

External links
The Duchy of Lancaster Act 1808, as amended, from the National Archives.
The Duchy of Lancaster Act 1808, as originally enacted, from the National Archives.

United Kingdom Acts of Parliament 1808
Duchy of Lancaster